Tochukwu Young Umezulike , better known as Toks Asher Young, is a Nigerian talent manager, entrepreneur and executive producer. He is also the author of the book, DEUCES: An Anthology of WORDS, RHYMES & POEMS.

Early life and education 
Toks Asher Young was born in Adazi, Anambra State and raised in Enugu State. Toks hails from Umueji, Ufuma, in Orumba North Local Government Area of Anambra State. He is a graduate of Nnamdi Azikiwe University, Awka in Anambra State where he studied electro-Mechanics and was later posted to Ise Orun Council, Ekiti State for his one year national service.

Career 

In 2007/2008, Juju a dancehall artiste living in Amsterdam made Toks his manager after he had helped him secure a collaboration with 2baba, plan his album launch and debut into the Nigerian Music industry.

The following year Toks became the manager to General Pype and realized he could actually do talent management as a career, and so his career as a talent manager kicked-off. As well as being Pype’s manager Toks was also General Manager and co-founder at Podium Worldwide aka Poduim Vybez.

In 2009, he and Storm Records executive produced Champion by dancehall artist, General Pype.

In June 2014, Umezulike got a contract from former Etisalat, now known as 9Mobile to be the talent manager for their Cloud Nine musical event series held in Port Harcourt and Abuja, Nigeria.

In 2017 He was the resident judge for the first edition of THE GROUNDED TALENT SEARCH which was won by BShine an indigenous hiphop artist based in Enugu State, Nigeria.

He also modelled for Zlni Couture’s 2017 Summer collection.

He has worked with some public figures like Kenny Keke Ogungbe, Dayo D1 Adeneye, Obi Asika and Ayo Rotimi who also mentored him on his career.

He is the manager to Naeto C, Yung6ix, Kollydee and Grindha.

Production credit 
In 2010, "Champion (Remix)" video  executively produced by Toks won the Channel O Music Video Awards as the Best Ragga Dancehall Video.

Awards

References 

Living people
Nigerian film producers
People from Anambra State
Talent managers
Year of birth missing (living people)